José María Fernández Calleja (16 May 1955 – 21 April 2020) was a Spanish journalist, political prisoner during the Francisco Franco era and anti-ETA activist. 

He was born in Ponferrada, Spain. Until the end of the ETA's activity, he had to live with bodyguards as he was under threat of death from the Basque separatist group. 

Calleja died in Madrid, aged 64, after suffering from COVID-19 during the COVID-19 pandemic in Spain, on 21 April 2020.

References

2020 deaths
20th-century Spanish journalists
1955 births
People from Madrid
Impact of the COVID-19 pandemic on journalism
21st-century journalists
Spanish male journalists
Deaths from the COVID-19 pandemic in Spain